Richard Pyke (15 August 1877 – 4 December 1914) was an Australian cricketer. He played in two first-class matches for Queensland between 1903 and 1910.

See also
 List of Queensland first-class cricketers

References

External links
 

1877 births
1914 deaths
Australian cricketers
Queensland cricketers
Cricketers from Melbourne